Georgia Walters (born 6 April 1993) is a Welsh footballer, who plays for Sheffield United and the Welsh national team. She has previously played for Swindon Town, Reading, Tranmere Rovers, Blackburn Rovers and Liverpool.

Club career
Walters has played for Swindon Town, initially at youth level, and later at senior level. In 2012, she received a scholarship to play in the US. As of 2015, she was playing for Reading, and she later played for Tranmere Rovers. 

In February 2020, Walters signed for Blackburn Rovers; she made two appearances before the season was cancelled due to the COVID-19 pandemic. In July 2020, she signed a new contract with Blackburn. In total, she scored three goals in 20 league appearances for the club, and was shortlisted for the club's 2020–21 player of the season award. She left Blackburn at the end of that season, and joined Liverpool in September 2021 on a non-contract basis. In January 2022, Walters signed for Sheffield United on a contract until the end of the 2021–22 season. She played every match for Sheffield United that season, and later signed a new contract with the club prior to the 2022–23 season.

International career
In 2015, Walters attended a Wales national team training camp. In September 2019, Walters received her first callup to the squad. She made her debut in a 2020 match against the Faroe Islands, coming on as a substitute in the 62nd minute. In 2021, she was included in Wales squads for friendly matches against Canada and Denmark, and their October 2023 FIFA Women's World Cup qualification matches.

References

External links

UEFA

1992 births
Living people
Wales women's international footballers
Women's Championship (England) players
Liverpool F.C. Women players
Tranmere Rovers L.F.C. players
Reading F.C. Women players
Swindon Town W.F.C. players
Blackburn Rovers L.F.C. players
Welsh women's footballers
Women's association football forwards